Kasbani Bin Kasmon (born 14 April 1989), better known by his nickname, Que Andrea Kasbani, is a Singaporean fitness model and a cover model who has been featured in various magazines such as the Manja Magazine (Singapore), Mangga (Malaysia), Maskulin Magazine (Malaysia), REPS Magazine (Indonesia), Cosmopolitan Magazine (Singapore), SUTRA Magazine (Singapore) and Ifitness Magazine (Singapore) as well as on the fitness sutra website. Apart from modeling, Kasbani is also a freelance actor and has been featured on show such as BlogTv on ChannelNewsAsia and on Suria.

Pageantry 

Kasbani has participated in numerous pageant contest and won titles such as 3rd Runner Up in Mister Singapore 2010, Singapore Best Abs in Manhunt Singapore 2010, and the winner for Mister Singapore South East Asia 2010. In the year 2011, Kasbani has participated in 8 DAYS Magazine Shirtless Guy Search and he won "Mr Social Butterfly" title and award by StarHub. In 2012, Kasbani also has participated Best Model of the World Singapore contest and he won "Mr Physique" title.

Modeling career 
Kasbani is a fitness model for magazines in Singapore, Malaysia and Indonesia. He was featured in Indonesia's front cover REPS Magazine in 2011 and 2012 and was named the top 7th fitness model in Indonesia by the magazine. Two Malaysia's magazines drew interest in him and he was featured in articles in Maskulin and Mangga.

In the year 2010, Kasbani was also featured as the most "hot single" by Manja Magazine in Singapore. Apart from magazines, Kasbani also appears in many other prints. He was Mr. January 2010 in the Singapore Calendar Guys 2010 and was featured as Hot Bod in local newspapers such as The New Paper, The Straits Times Urban and Berita Harian.

He became the sponsored athlete/fitness model and spokesperson for NutriFirst, one of Singapore's largest supplement online store, from the year 2009 to 2013.

Bodybuilding career 
In the year 2015, Kasbani Kasmon was crowned the overall champion, national level, in the Men's Physique category. Kasbani Kasmon represent Fitness Movement League ProTeam athlete. He became the first Men's Physique athlete in Singapore who has been commissioned by NspireSL his pro status.

In 2016, he retired from bodybuilding and opened a gym.

Early life and education 
Kasbani was born and raised in Singapore by his Malay Singaporean parents. He is the eldest to his two other siblings.

After his secondary school, he pursues his education in visual communication (graphic design). Kasbani was awarded with a scholarship during his study and he graduated with a diploma in graphic design.

Back then, he weighed 45 kg and he began his weight training at the age of 19 years. In 2009, upon completed his studies, he was called up for national service in the Singapore Police Force. By then his physique already up for the challenge. He was posted to the Public Transport Security Command (TransCom), a specialized unit of the SPF.

After completing national service, he pursued and completed his education in Royal Melbourne Institute of Technology University (RMIT), Australia. He graduated and was awarded a bachelor of design (communication design) degree with distinction.

Filmography 
Apart from modeling, Kasbani is also a freelance actor and appears on television and in plays.

Film

Television

Theatre

References

1989 births
Living people
Singaporean male stage actors
Singaporean male television actors
Singaporean male models